Laphria thoracica is a species of robber flies in the family Asilidae.

References

External links

 

thoracica
Articles created by Qbugbot
Insects described in 1805